The New Cross Pacific Cable System (NCP) is a proposed cable system in the Pacific Ocean.

Its landing points are planned to be:
 Chongming and Nanhui New City in China
 Maruyama, Japan
 Busan, South Korea
 Toucheng, Taiwan
 Pacific City, Oregon, in the United States

References

See also 
 Pacific Light Cable Network

Submarine communications cables in the Pacific Ocean